Peter Narup (born 22 June 1969 in Östersund) is a Swedish curler and world champion.

He won gold medals in the 1997, 2001 and 2004 World Curling Championships, and received silver medals in 1998 and 2000, all times with skip Peja Lindholm.

Narup is European champion from 1998 and 2001 (with skip Peja Lindholm), and has received a total of seven medals in the European championships.

Narup has normally played Number one on Lindholm's team. He participated on the European team in the Continental Cup of Curling 2002, 2003 and 2004.

In 1998 he was inducted into the Swedish Curling Hall of Fame.

References

External links
 

1969 births
Living people
Swedish male curlers
World curling champions
European curling champions
Swedish curling champions
Curlers at the 1998 Winter Olympics
Curlers at the 2002 Winter Olympics
Curlers at the 2006 Winter Olympics
Olympic curlers of Sweden
Continental Cup of Curling participants
20th-century Swedish people
21st-century Swedish people